Blind Love is a 2016 Pakistani romantic film directed by Faisal Bukhari. The film has been written by M Pervaiz Kaleem. The film stars Yasir Shah and Nimra Khan in the main lead with Fawad Jalal, Aamir Qureshi, Imran Bukhari and Mathira as supporting actors.

Plot 
The story starts in the city of Lahore, where three friends Daniyal (Yasir Shah), Nomi (Imran Bukhari) and Baba (Aamir Qureshi) plan for the biggest bank robbery of Lahore. They put their masks on and rob the bank. The action sequence that take place while doing the robbery, a girl name Sara (Nimra Khan) who is the Bank Manager gets injured. She does survive but loses her sight. Daniyal, when get to know that it is him and his gang who are responsible for Sara's lost eyesight starts behaving more concerned towards her and eventually falls in love with Sara. Neither of them are aware that Inspector (Fawad Jalal) is continuing to investigate, who ran over Sara will soon conclude that the suspect is none other than Daniyal and his gang.

Daniyal, a gangster helps Sara, a blind girl in fulfilling her dream but will she ever know that the Reason of losing her eyesight was Daniyal?

Watch as events unfold on 5 August 2016 and the impact this will have on Daniyal and Sara.

Cast 
 Yasir Shah as Daniyal
 Nimra Khan as Sara
 Aamir Qureshi as Baba
 Malik Naseer
 Fawad Jalal as Inspector
 Mathira (Special Appearance)
 Imran Bukhari as Nomi

Production 
The film is the debut of Yasir Shah as a film actor.

Soundtrack

Release 
The film trailer was released on 24 May 2016 and the movie was set for release on Eid al-Fitr but due to lack of screens on Eid, film was postponed. It was released on 5 August 2016 in cinemas all across Pakistan.

Awards and nominations

See  also 
List of Pakistani films of 2016

References

External links

Pakistani romance films
2010s Urdu-language films